Kaya Yanar (born 20 May 1973) is a German (formerly Turkish) comedian, best known for his comedy show Was guckst du?! (Whatcha lookin' at?!).

Early life 
Yanar was born in Frankfurt am Main, West Germany, to Turkish-Arabic immigrants from Antakya. While at school he once told his teacher that he wanted to be a comedian, which made the teacher laugh. In an interview with German talkshow host Johannes B. Kerner Yanar described his childhood as a more liberal one and stated that despite his Turkish nationality, he cannot speak the Turkish language. After graduating from Heinrich-von-Gagern-Gymnasium (a school in Frankfurt) he studied phonetics, American studies and philosophy but left university prior to graduation.

Career 
In his one-man comedy show Was guckst du?!, Yanar toys with well-known cultural stereotypes both as host and main performer. For one of his best known sketches about an East Indian, Ranjid and his pet cow (and substitute best friend) Benita, he practiced pidgin-English for months, which he learned from some Indian friends of his from university. He also parodies the stereotypical way Turkish migrants use to speak.

Furthermore, he toured through Germany with solo programmes. Fixations of his programmes "Made in Germany" (2008), "Live und unzensiert" (2009) and "All Inclusive!" (2013) were broadcast by German TV station RTL.

He also presented the ZDF-Show "Kaya Yanar testet Deutschland – die Multi-Kulti-Show (2007)" as part of a theme week focusing on integration. Because of his great success being without precedent for an artist with Turkish migration background in the German-speaking countries at the time of his appearance, Yanar is considered as a key figure and trailblazer for the acceptance of multicultural issues.

Since December 2012 Yanar is godfather of the "Heinrich-Middendorf-Oberschule Aschendorf" in the project "Schule ohne Rassismus – Schule mit Courage" ("School without racism - school with courage").

In 2014 RTL started broadcasting his show ""Geht's noch?! Kayas Woche"", a weekly current affairs programme with a mixture of stand up comedy and political satire.

Kaya Yanar is also a member of the jury in the German "Comedy Grand-Prix"; an annual comedy contest which is broadcast on TV to seek the "best German comedian".

Personal life 
Kaya is a vegan (formerly pescetarian), he is an animal rights activist and he supports PETA.

Selected filmography 
 2004: Was guckst du?! – Season 1–4
 2008: Made in Germany Live
 2008: Dekker & Adi - Wer bremst verliert!
 2008: Was guckst du?! – Season 5–8
 2009: Live und unzensiert (Live and uncensored)
 2009-2011: Schillerstraße
 since 2011: Stars bei der Arbeit (with Dieter Tappert as Paul Panzer)
 2012: Die Kaya Show (Actor and Host)
 2012: 
 2013: Typisch Deutsch
 2014: Geht's noch?! Kayas Woche

Discography

CDs 
 2001: Suchst du
 2003: Welttournee durch Deutschland
 2008: Made in Germany Live (DE #32)

DVDs 
 2004: Was guckst du?! – Best of Staffel 1–4
 2008: Made in Germany Live
 2008: Was guckst du?! – Best of Staffel 5–8
 2009: Live und unzensiert
 2011: Kaya Yanar & Paul Panzer Stars bei der Arbeit
 2015: Around the world

Books 
 2011: Made in Germany beim Heyne Verlag,

Awards 
 2001: Deutscher Fernsehpreis Beste Comedy for Was guckst du?!
 2001: Deutscher Comedypreis Beste Comedysendung for Was guckst du?!
 2001: Romy (TV award) Beste Programmidee for Was guckst du?!
 2001: Civis media prize
 2005: Grüne Palme for outstanding contribution to international understanding (für besondere Verdienste um die Völkerverständigung)
 2009: Golden record for the DVD Made in Germany-Live
 2012:  Comedy-Award
 2013: Deutscher Comedypreis Bestes TV-Soloprogramm for Kaya live! All inclusive
 2014: Deutscher Comedypreis Bester Komiker

Notes

References 
 Time magazine article on Kaya Yanar and Was guckst du? (archived version from 2010)

External links 

 
 Kaya Yanar's Website

German male comedians
German people of Turkish descent
Living people
1973 births
Television people from Frankfurt
Sat.1 people
RTL Group people